Cinema Transcendental is an album by Brazilian singer and composer Caetano Veloso, released in 1979. Some of the album tracks were hits in Brazil, such as "Lua de São Jorge", "Oração ao Tempo", and "Beleza Pura".

Track listing
All songs by Caetano Veloso except where noted otherwise

References

Caetano Veloso albums
1979 albums
PolyGram albums
Portuguese-language albums